Carl Grossberg, originally Georg Carl Wilhelm Grandmontagne (6 September 1894 – 19 October 1940) was a German painter associated with the New Objectivity movement; best known for his urban and industrial scenes.

Biography
He received his primary education in Lennep and Elberfeld. After 1913, he studied architecture in Aachen and Darmstadt. During that time, his father changed the family name from Grandmontagne to Grossberg; much to Carl's displeasure. He was drafted in 1915 and sent to the front, where he was wounded. After being mustered out in 1918, he returned to Elberfeld.

In 1919, he resumed his studies; first with Walther Klemm at the "Hochschule für Bildende Künste" in Weimar then, in 1921, with Lyonel Feininger at the Bauhaus. Upon completing his studies, he moved to Sommerhausen, near Würzburg, where he was married in 1923 to Mathilde Schwarz. Three years later, he had his first solo exhibition in Stuttgart, followed by another at the Galerie Nierendorf in Berlin and several others in Cologne and Düsseldorf. His most successful showing came in 1929 at the "Neue Sachlichkeit" exhibition in the Stedelijk Museum in Amsterdam. Two years later, the Prussian Academy of Arts awarded him its "Rompreis".

After 1933, he began work on an ambitious series of paintings he called the "Industrial Plan", depicting Germany's most important industries, but it was never completed. The following year, he received a commission for a monumental wall painting, to be displayed at an exhibition called "German People-German Work". A major retrospective was held at the Museum Folkwang in 1935.

In August 1939, he was drafted again and sent as an officer to the Polish front. While on leave in France, he was involved in automobile accident in the Compiègne. His official death is listed as October 19, 1940. While most biographers list Grossberg as dying from the automobile accident, some historians believe that he died from a self-inflicted gunshot wound.

Selected paintings

References 

 Michalski, Sergiusz (1994). New Objectivity. Cologne: Taschen. 
 Schmied, Wieland (1978). Neue Sachlichkeit and German Realism of the Twenties. London: Arts Council of Great Britain. 
 Ingo F. Walher (red.) Kunst in de 20e eeuw. Deel II. Bijlage: Biografieën. Taschen, Cologne 2005

External links

ArtNet: More works by Grossberg.
Carl Grossberg @ Weimar Art (blog)
Harvard Art Museum Archives: Dietlinde Hamburger Collection of Carl Grossberg Papers

1894 births
1940 deaths
Bauhaus alumni
People from Elberfeld
20th-century German painters
20th-century German male artists
German male painters
Road incident deaths in France
People from the Rhine Province
Artists from Wuppertal
German Army personnel of World War I
German Army officers of World War II